Conservative Victory: Defeating Obama's Radical Agenda is a 2010 book by conservative political commentator and media personality Sean Hannity.

Conservative Victory was published by HarperCollins with an initial printing of 1.5 million books, which were released on March 30, 2010.  It was Hannity's first publication in six years. It was principally edited by David Limbaugh. It became Hannity's third New York Times Bestseller, reaching number one on the paperback nonfiction list.

References 

2010 non-fiction books
Books critical of modern liberalism in the United States
American political books
Books by Sean Hannity
Books about Barack Obama
HarperCollins books